This is a list of American political podcasts. They are listed in alphabetical order.

List

See also
 List of daily news podcasts
 Political podcast

References

American political
Political podcasts
American podcasts
Politics of the United States